Inner Urge is a composition by jazz saxophonist Joe Henderson
It may also refer to
Inner Urge (Joe Henderson album), a 1964 album featuring the above composition
Inner Urge (Larry Coryell album), a 2001 album featuring the above composition